Yangatau (Yanğantaw) is a rural locality (a selo) and the administrative centre of Yangatausky Selsoviet, Salavatsky District, Bashkortostan, Russia. The population was 1,017 as of 2010. There are 4 streets.

Geography 
Yangatau is located 17 km north of Maloyaz (the district's administrative centre) by road. Chulpan is the nearest rural locality.

References 

Rural localities in Salavatsky District